Elections to Liverpool City Council were held on Tuesday 1 November 1886. One third of the council seats were up for election, the term of office of each councillor being three years.

After the election, the composition of the council was:

Election result

Ward results

* - Retiring Councillor seeking re-election

Abercromby

Castle Street

Everton

Exchange

Great George

Lime Street

North Toxteth

Pitt Street

Rodney Street

St. Anne Street

St. Paul's

St. Peter's

Scotland

South Toxteth

Vauxhall

West Derby

Aldermanic Election

At the meeting of the Council on 9 November 1886, the terms of office of eight 
alderman expired. The following eight were elected as Aldermen by the Council (Aldermen and Councillors) on 9 November 1886 for a term of six years.

* - re-elected aldermen.

By-elections

No. 2, Scotland, Tuesday 2 November 1886

Caused by the resignation of Cllr. Laurence Connolly MP (Irish Home Rule, Scotland, elected 1 November 1884).

No. 13, St. Anne's Street, 23 November 1886

Caused by the election of Dr. William Cross (Conservative, St. Anne's Street, 
elected 1 November 1886) as an alderman by the Council on 9 November 1886.

No. 11, Abercromby

Alderman John Pearson died on 2 June 1887.
Councillor Anthony Bower (Conservative, Abercromby, elected 1 November 1884) 
 was elected by the council as an alderman on 6 July 1887.

See also

 Liverpool City Council
 Liverpool Town Council elections 1835 - 1879
 Liverpool City Council elections 1880–present
 Mayors and Lord Mayors of Liverpool 1207 to present
 History of local government in England

References

1886
1886 English local elections
1880s in Liverpool